Arcangelo Resani (1670–1740) was an Italian painter of the Baroque period. He was born at Rome and was a pupil of Giovanni Battista Boncuore. He chiefly excelled in painting animals and hunted game. His simple realistic works were highly esteemed at Siena, Bologna, and Venice. His portrait, with dead game in the background, is in the Uffizi collection.

Partial Anthology
 Piccioni nel nido
 Cane e sporta 
 Piccione morto
 Pernice e piatto

References
 

1670 births
1740 deaths
Painters from Rome
17th-century Italian painters
Italian male painters
18th-century Italian painters
Italian Baroque painters
Italian still life painters
Italian painters of animals
18th-century Italian male artists